Dukagjin Gorani (Albanian)  Dukađin Gorani) is a journalist and media expert from Kosovo. Born in Pejë, he became one of the founders of weekly Koha in 1993, and was the first editor of Koha Ditore daily. He was one of the founders and first Editor-in-chief of the Daily Express.

Career
Gorani has served as a senior advisor to the Prime Minister of Republic of Kosovo Hashim Thaçi. He is also a manager of Kosovo Institute for Journalism and Communication.

Dukagjin Gorani lives and works in Pristina.

References

External links
 Gazeta Express
 Gazeta Koha
 Office of the Prime Minister of Republic of Kosovo

Kosovan journalists
Living people
Year of birth missing (living people)